Michael Crichton (1942–2008) was an American novelist and screenwriter. He wrote 28 novels and his books have sold over 200 million copies worldwide, and over a dozen have been adapted into films.

Bibliography

Novels

Post-Crichton Novels

Nonfiction

Short fiction

Film and television

Film

Television

Derivative works

Films based on Crichton's novels

Sequel to Crichton's film

Television series based on Crichton's films

Novels adapted into television series

In development

References

External links

Bibliographies by writer